Katangini is a market village in Matungulu Constituency, located in the lower eastern region of Kenya and about 15 kilometres west of Tala on Thika road. It is 3,000 ft above sea level. it is also approximately 96 Kilometres from the capital of Kenya Nairobi.

People/Languages
The main language spoken is Kikamba although the people who live there understand both Swahili and English.

Schools
Schools within the village include:
 St. Francis of Assis Kwatombe Secondary School
 Katangini Secondary School
 St. Francis of Assis Kwatombe Primary School
 St Getrude Nursery School

Religion
Residents of Katangini are mostly Christians with,
 St. Francis of Assis Catholic Church and
 Redeemed Gospel Church all within the village

Other amenities
 Corrugated weather road(Thika Road) connecting it to Tala.
 Kijito Wind pumped bore hole

References
 http://info.mzalendo.com/projects/in/kangundo/( Find list of shared social amenities)

Populated places in Eastern Province (Kenya)
Machakos County